Henry Thomson Burtis (1896–1971) was an American writer.

Burtis was born in New York. After serving as a lieutenant in US Army Air Service and as a member of the aerial border patrol, Burtis worked as a newspaper reporter before becoming a writer.  He wrote more than two hundred stories for pulp magazines such as Adventure as well as over 20 novels, most of which had an aviation theme and were written for children. Many of his stories appeared in The American Boy. In Old Oklahoma was one of several films that were adapted from his short stories.

Thomson Burtis died in Santa Monica, California, on April 24, 1971.

Bibliography

Russ Farrell series

 Russ Farrell, Airman
 Russ Farrell, Border Patrolman
 Russ Farrell, Test Pilot (1925)
 Russ Farrell, Circus Flyer
 Russ Farrell, Over Mexico

Rex Lee series

 Rex Lee, Gypsy Flyer 
 Rex Lee, On the Border Patrol (1928)
 Rex Lee, Ranger of the Sky (1928)
 Rex Lee, Sky Trailer (1929)
 Rex Lee, Ace of the Airmail
 Rex Lee, Night Flyer (1929)
 Rex Lee's Mysterious Flight (1930)
 Rex Lee, Rough Rider of the Air
 Rex Lee, Aerial Acrobat
 Rex Lee, Trialing Air Bandits (1931)

Air Combat Stories for Boys series

 Daredevils of the Air (1932)
 Four Aces (1932)
 Wing for Wing (1932)
 Flying Blackbirds

Individual novels
 Haunted Airways
 Straight Shooting
 Flying Blood
 New Guinea Gold (adapted into the movie Crosswinds (film))

Other works
 Sisters of the Chorus (play)

References

External links
 

1896 births
1971 deaths
American male short story writers
Pulp fiction writers
20th-century American short story writers
20th-century American male writers